The  is a Japanese international school (nihonjin gakkō) located in the Wannsee area of Steglitz-Zehlendorf, Berlin, Germany.

The fourth nihonjin gakkō in Germany, the school opened in 1993.

See also

 Japanese people in Germany
German international schools in Japan:
German School Tokyo Yokohama - in Yokohama, Japan
Deutsche Schule Kobe/European School

Further reading
 池田 克己 (北海道茅部郡森町立森小学校・ベルリン日本人国際学校(前)). "ベルリン日本人国際学校における国際理解教育の実践(第3章総合的な学習)." 在外教育施設における指導実践記録 27, 43–46, 2004. Profile at CiNii

References

External links
 Japanese School in Berlin 

International schools in Berlin
Berlin
Buildings and structures in Steglitz-Zehlendorf
1993 establishments in Germany
Educational institutions established in 1993